Boophis picturatus is a frog species in the family Mantellidae. It is endemic to Madagascar.

Its natural habitats are subtropical or tropical moist lowland forests and rivers. It is not considered threatened by the IUCN.

References

 

picturatus
Endemic frogs of Madagascar
Amphibians described in 2001
Taxonomy articles created by Polbot